BHB is the debut and only album from pop music group Ballas Hough Band formed by Dancing with the Stars professional dancers Derek Hough and Mark Ballas. The album was released on March 10, 2009 via Hollywood Records.

On the chart week of March 28, 2009, the album made its chart debut at #98 on the U.S. Billboard 200. The album's first single, "Do It for You", failed to chart, as well as the second single "Do You Love Me".

Critical reception 

Allmusic reviewer Matt Collar resulted that "the resulting sound is definitely more rock-informed than one might expect and should draw favorable comparisons to such similarly inclined outfits as Maroon 5 and the Jonas Brothers. Collar also listed "Do You Love Me", "Fall", and "Do It for You" as the album's stand-out tracks.

Track listing 
 "Do You Love Me" (Kevin Kadish, John O'Brien) — 2:45
 "Devastated" (Martin Briley, Dana Calitri, Nina Ossoff) — 3:12
 "Closer" (Mark Ballas, Derek Hough, John Fields, Dan Wilson) — 3:04
 "She Was the One" Ryan Lindsey, Wilson) — 4:00
 "Longing For" (Ballas) — 4:29
 "Birthday" (Ballas) — 3:39
 "Fall" (Ballas, Hough, Emily Grace, Sam Marder, Joanna Pacitti, Harry Sullivan — 3:26
 "Do It for You" (Kara DioGuardi, Marty James, Ari Levine) — 3:27
 "Break Through" (Ballas, Hough, Andy Dodd, Adam Watts) — 3:05
 "Together Faraway" (Ballas) — 3:46
 "Underwater" (Ballas) — 4:11
 "Turnin' Me On (Bonus Track)" (Dan Wilson) - 3:00

Personal 

 Jim Anton – bass
 Mark Ballas – guitar, vocals
 Tommy Barbarella – organ, synthesizer, effects
 Ken Chastain – percussion, keyboards, programming
 Bradley Cook – engineer
 Andy Dodd – guitar, keyboards, programming, producer, mixing
 John Fields – bass, guitar, keyboards, programming, producer, engineer, mixing, synthesizer bass
 Serban Ghenea – mixing
 Emily Grace – keyboards, vocals
 Paul David Hager – mixing
 David Ryan Harris – guitar
 Derek Hough – guitar, vocals
 Marty James – vocals
 Ari Levine – keyboards, programming, producer
 Stephen Lu – strings
 Sam Marder – bass
 Dave McNair – mastering
 Aaron Patzner – violin
 Lewis Patzner – cello
 Marc Pfafflin – beats
 Tim Pierce – guitar
 Nic Rodriguez – production assistant, pro-tools
 Jamie Seyberth – mixing assistant
 David Snow – creative director
 Harry Sullivan – drums
 Gavin Taylor – art direction, design
 Adam Watts – keyboards, programming, producer, mixing
 Geoffrey Weiss – A&R
 Lincoln Wheeler – marketing
 Dan Wilson – piano

Chart performance

References 

2009 debut albums
Hollywood Records albums
Ballas Hough Band albums